Final Curtain is a 1947 crime novel by the New Zealand author Ngaio Marsh, the fourteenth in her series of mysteries featuring Scotland Yard detective Roderick Alleyn. It was published in Britain by Collins and in the USA by Little, Brown. Although set in a large English country house, immediately after the 2nd World War, it is effectively one of Ngaio Marsh's crime stories with a theatrical setting, given that it concerns Alleyn's wife Agatha Troy accepting a commission to paint a portrait of the great actor Sir Henry Ancred in the role of Macbeth, onstage at the theatre of his ancestral home, Ancreton Manor, to be unveiled at his 70th birthday party, amongst his family, most of whom are actively involved in the London theatre, one way or another. The novel was well received and reviewed.

Plot
In 1946 England, with World War Two finally ended, the painter Agatha Troy awaits (not without trepidation, after a lengthy wartime separation) the return of her husband Roderick Alleyn, who has been chasing spies in New Zealand (as in the preceding two books in the series, Colour Scheme and Died in the Wool), while 'Troy' (as she is invariably called) has been making maps and 'pictorial surveys for the army'. She reluctantly accepts a commission to paint the celebrated actor Sir Henry Ancred at his ancestral home Ancreton Manor, where she meets his adult children and grandchildren, and witnesses the tensions and dynamics of a family of theatricals, all with temperaments to match. The main cause of trouble is the bitterly resented presence in the household of Sonia Orrincourt, a brassy young actress Sir Henry has made his mistress and then fiancée.  A series of practical jokes are generally felt to be the work of Sir Henry's youngest granddaughter, Patricia (known as Panty), a precocious, outspoken, mischievous child currently attending a school evacuated to Ancreton during the war, where an outbreak of ringworm has happened. Soon after the portrait is finished, Sir Henry, who has been in poor health, dies, apparently of natural causes, and his will (which he has recently changed) creates a furore of suspicion and accusation among the Ancred family. Troy returns home and is reunited with her husband. Alleyn is soon assigned to investigate Sir Henry's death, which proves to have been a case of poisoning by thallium (a depilatory used in those days as a preparatory to the treatment of ringworm). Soon, another murder occurs, and Alleyn duly identifies the killer.

Background and commentary
Ngaio Marsh, as her biographers Margaret Lewis and Joanne Drayton describe, spent World War Two in her native New Zealand, living with her father at their home outside Christchurch, continuing to write her increasingly popular crime novels, two of which (Colour Scheme and Died in the Wool) are set in New Zealand, and devoting much energy and creativity to directing and touring the Canterbury University Players in memorable productions, revitalising the New Zealand theatre in the process.

Final Curtain, written in New Zealand and set in 1946 England, should really be considered as the third of Marsh's 'theatre' novels, despite its setting in the traditional country house of a well-to-do family, because the Ancreds are flamboyant theatricals, revolving around paterfamilias Sir Henry, a grand old classical actor, somewhat in the tradition of Sir Donald Wolfitt. Sir Henry belongs in a line of Marsh's larger-than-life, often egotistical or temperamental theatre stars, including Adam Poole in Opening Night, Mary Bellamy in False Scent, Marcus Knight in Death at the Dolphin, Isabella Sommita in Photo Finish, and  Sir Dougal Macdougal in Light Thickens, who share a regrettable tendency to arouse hostility and in some cases get bumped off. Among her cast of suspects, Marsh includes... her customary nice young couple of juveniles, one of her bitchily camp young designers, one of her many cats - Marsh, like Dorothy L Sayers, was a great cat lover, and featured them prominently in her crime fiction - and the first of her monstrously knowing juveniles, Panty, who bears a passing kinship to Josephine in Agatha Christie's 1949 crime novel Crooked House, a Christie favourite among her own books.

Comparison with Christie is interesting as regards Final Curtain 's use of the poisonous element thallium. Marsh was a thorough and careful researcher, but she did not enjoy the advantage of Christie's experience in both World Wars, working in hospital pharmacies. Thallium is rare in real life criminal cases (eg Martha Marek in 1930s Austria or Graham Young in 1970s England). When Christie used it in her ingenious 1962 novel The Pale Horse, she described with great accuracy the symptoms of a slow-acting poison, whereas in Final Curtain, thallium's effects are well described as regards its depilatory and post mortem effects, but not in terms of its symptoms after ingestion... not that it matters to the reader of an ingenious classic Ngaio Marsh whodunit, combining social comedy and murder mystery.

Television adaptation 
Final Curtain was adapted in 1993 for the BBC TV series The Inspector Alleyn Mysteries, starring Patrick Malahide as Roderick Alleyn, Belinda Lang as Agatha Troy and a cast including Elinor Bron and Jonathan Cullen.

External links

References

Roderick Alleyn novels
1947 British novels
Novels about artists
William Collins, Sons books
Little, Brown and Company books
British detective novels
Novels by Ngaio Marsh